Two Nights with Cleopatra is a 1954 Italian comedy film directed by Mario Mattoli and starring Sophia Loren.

Plot
Cesare, a Roman soldier, comes to Alexandria to serve in the army staff of the Egyptian queen Cleopatra. Cleopatra is a beautiful woman, able to charm anyone, and is the wife of Emperor Mark Antony, but when he is not in the city, she prefers to spend the night with one or another of his soldiers, whom she will then have killed the next day with poison.
 
When Mark Antony comes back to Alexandria to fight a war, Cleopatra visits him secretly while her place at the palace is taken by Nisca, a girl who is so like her she can pass as her double, except for being blonde. It turns out that on one of the evenings on which Cleopatra has been swapped for her double, Cesare fails to notice this. Unaware of the exchange, Cesare spends the night with the girl who proves to be very fragile and sad.

The next night Cesare is arrested for trying to hurt Cleopatra (the real one) but in reality the man just wanted to say hello. Intrigued by the fact that Cesare wears a ring identical to hers, Cleopatra makes him free and offers to spend the night with him, warning him that the next day he will die. Cesare, however, manages to get drunk and to free the "queen" Nisca, locked up in prison. The film ends with the two fleeing from Alexandria.

Cast
 Sophia Loren as Cleopatra / Nisca
 Alberto Sordi as Cesarino
 Ettore Manni as Marcantonio
 Paul Muller as Tortul
 Rolf Tasna as Meros 
 Nando Bruno as Legionary
 Alberto Talegalli as Enobarbo
 Gianni Cavalieri as Taverniere
 Carlo Dale as Cocis
 Riccardo Garrone as Venus
 Ughetto Bertucci as Merchant
 Giacomo Furia as Merchant
 Enzo Garinei as Merchant
 Andrea Bosic as Caio Malpurnio

References

External links

1954 films
1954 comedy films
Italian comedy films
1950s Italian-language films
Films directed by Mario Mattoli
Films scored by Armando Trovajoli
Cultural depictions of Mark Antony
Depictions of Cleopatra on film
1950s Italian films